Selenide borates, officially known as borate selenides, are chemical mixed anion compounds that contain any kind of borate and selenide ions. They are distinct from selenoborates in which selenium atoms replace oxygen in borates. There are also analogous borate sulfides, with sulfur ions instead of selenium.

List

References

Borates
Selenides
Mixed anion compounds